Sacing Prue Jerry is a Bangladeshi politician from Bandarban belonging to Bangladesh Nationalist Party. He is a former member of the Jatiya Sangsad. He is the son of Aung Shwe Prue Chowdhury. His aunt Ma Mya Ching  is a former member of the Jatiya Sangsad.

Biography
Jerry is a prince of Bohmong Circle. He was elected as a member of the Jatiya Sangsad from Bandarban in the Sixth General Election of Bangladesh.  He also served as the chairman of Bandarban Sadar Upazila and Bandarban Hill District Council.

References

Living people
People from Bandarban District
6th Jatiya Sangsad members
Bangladesh Nationalist Party politicians
Marma people
Bangladeshi Buddhists
Year of birth missing (living people)